, also known as Juliet of Boarding School, is a Japanese shōnen manga series written and illustrated by Yōsuke Kaneda. It began serialization in Kodansha's Bessatsu Shōnen Magazine in 2015, moved to Weekly Shōnen Magazine in 2017 and ended in 2019. Sixteen tankōbon volumes of the manga have been released. The manga is published digitally in English by Kodansha USA under the Kodansha Comics imprint from April 10, 2018. A light novel adaptation, written by Tadahito Mochizuki and illustrated by Kaneda, was published by Kodansha in a single volume on February 9, 2017. An anime television series adaptation by Liden Films aired from October 6 to December 22, 2018, in the Animeism programming block. The story of the series is based on the Shakespeare play Romeo and Juliet.

Plot

Boarding School Juliet takes place at Dahlia Academy Boarding School, where students come from two rivalling countries known as the "Nation of Touwa" and "Principality of West". This academy segregates its student body into two dormitories which reflects their nationality: the "Black Dogs" housing those from Touwa, and the "White Cats" housing those from the West. The story follows Romio Inuzuka, the 1st Year Leader of the "Black Dog Dormitory". Romio has had an unrequited love for Juliet Persia, the 1st Year Leader of the "White Cat Dormitory", since childhood. Initially hesitant, Romio decides to confess his love and resolves to change the world if it meant staying by Juliet's side. Juliet, impressed by Romio's determination, accepts his love. However, now both Romio and Juliet must work hard to keep their relationship a secret from other dorm mates while trying to avoid trouble.

Media

Manga
Boarding School Juliet is written and illustrated by Yōsuke Kaneda. The manga series began serialization in Kodansha's eighth issue of Bessatsu Shōnen Magazine in 2015 (with the one-shot having debuted the series in the first 2015 issue), before moving to Weekly Shōnen Magazine in 2017. As of November 15, 2019, sixteen volumes have been compiled in tankōbon format. In August 2019 it was announced that the manga would end on September 4. The series has been licensed in English for digital publication by Kodansha USA, who released the first volume under their Kodansha Comics imprint on April 10, 2018.

An anthology of chapters by various artists titled  was released on October 17, 2018.

Anime

An anime television series adaptation was announced in March 2018. The anime series is directed by Seiki Takuno and animated by Liden Films, with Takao Yoshioka written the scripts, Yūki Morimoto designed the characters and Masaru Yokoyama composed the music. The series aired from October 6 to December 22, 2018, during the Animeism programming block on MBS, TBS, BS-TBS. The series was streamed on Amazon Prime Video in Japan and markets other than China. The series' opening theme titled "Love With You" is performed by fripSide, and the ending theme titled  is performed by Riho Iida. The series ran for 12 episodes.

See also
The Classroom of a Black Cat and a Witch - Another manga series by the same author

Notes

References

External links
  
 

2017 Japanese novels
Anime series based on manga
Animeism
Comics based on works by William Shakespeare
Kodansha books
Kodansha manga
Liden Films
NBCUniversal Entertainment Japan
Romantic comedy anime and manga
School life in anime and manga
Shōnen manga
Works based on Romeo and Juliet